Commando is a 1988 Hindi-language Indian action film directed by B.Subhash and produced by Mushir-Riaz. It stars Mithun Chakraborty, Mandakini, Hemant Birje, Kim in lead roles. It was a commercial success at the box-office.

Plot
The film starts with an assassination attempt that fails as a police inspector jumps in front and saves the minister. The police dies, but his wife gets mad. Thus the son grows himself by training himself, same time caring for his mother, who is in treatment for mental sickness. Mithun, now as the story proceeds, saves mandakini during a murder attempt by the gunmen of shakthi kapoor. Gradually both fall in love, but mandakini father is against it. Mandakini father gets in good terms with the villain to get mithun arrested as mithun got trapped by shakthi kapoor with a lorry full of explosives, during which mithun overhears conversation among villains of an assassination attempt. Mandakini gets kidnapped by villains, but Mithun rescues mandakini and also kills the villains.. final scene shows the assassination attempt got defeated by Mithun. Mithuns mother, also attending this function, suddenly gets her memory back, recognises mithun and accepts mandakini as her daughter in law happily..

Cast

Mithun Chakraborty	as Chandar
Mandakini as Asha Malhotra
Hemant Birje as Diler Singh
Kim as Jhum Jhum
Shashi Kapoor as Inspector General
Dalip Tahil as Moolchand Bhalla
Shakti Kapoor as Mirza
Danny Denzongpa as Ninja
Amrish Puri as Marcellony
Om Shivpuri as Kailashpuri Malhotra
Asrani as Driver
Satish Shah as Ram Chong
Mac Mohan as Security Officer
Sarala Yeolekar as Chandar's Mother
Satish Kaul as Chandar's Father
Bob Christo as Marcellony's Henchman
Tom Alter as Hatcher
Asha Sharma as Indira Gandhi
Iftekhar as Restaurant Manager
Shashi Kiran as Police Inspector
Ajit Vachani as Doctor
Praveen Kumar

Soundtrack

The lyrics written by Anjaan to the music composed by Bappi Lahiri.

References

External links
 

1988 films
1980s Hindi-language films
Indian spy action films
Films directed by Babbar Subhash
Films scored by Bappi Lahiri
Indian martial arts films
Ninja films
1988 martial arts films
1988 action films